The Pace Gallery is an American contemporary and modern art gallery with 9 locations worldwide. It was founded in Boston by Arne Glimcher in 1960. His son, Marc Glimcher, is now president and CEO. Pace Gallery operates in New York, London, Hong Kong, Palo Alto, Geneva, Seoul, East Hampton, and Palm Beach.

The gallery is named after Glimcher's father's nickname "Pacey". It moved to Manhattan in 1963.

Gallery spaces

Pace
In 1960, at the age of 22, Arnold (Arne) Glimcher founded The Pace Gallery in Boston, which he ran with his wife, Milly, and his mother, Eva. In 1963, Glimcher partnered with Fred Mueller to bring the gallery to New York, where it opened a location on east 57th Street with the help of Ivan Karp, a close friend of Glimcher's. In 1965, Glimcher closed the Boston gallery and moved his family permanently to New York. Three years later, the gallery moved to its long-time location at 32 East 57th Street.

After the Pace Gallery closed its Boston location in 1963, Eva Glimcher maintained a branch of the Pace Gallery in Columbus, Ohio from 1965 to 1982, located downtown on Broad Street. After her death, the branch closed.

In the 1960s, Glimcher and Irving Blum briefly operated a Pace outpost on La Cienega Boulevard in Los Angeles.

From 1995 to 1999, PaceWildenstein had a gallery in Beverly Hills, designed by architect Charles Gwathmey.

From 2008 until 2019, PaceWildenstein – and later Pace – maintained a  space gallery in the Factory 798 District of Beijing, China; it was the first major Manhattan art gallery with a presence in the city. It opened in 2008, to coincide with the Summer Olympics in the city. Under the direction of its president, Leng Lin, Pace Beijing showed a mixture of American, European, and Asian artists.

In April 2014, Pace used the former Tesla Motors building in Menlo Park, California as a  temporary exhibition space. It later operated a permanent gallery in downtown Palo Alto from 2016 to 2022.

Also in 2014, Pace operated a temporary space in Chesa Büsin, a historic 12th century house in Zuoz, Switzerland. In 2018, it opened a permanent  gallery in Geneva.

Pace opened its first space in Seoul – a  gallery – in 2017 before moving to a  space in the city's Hannam-dong district, designed by Minsuk Cho.

In 2019, Pace opened a new space in New York's Chelsea district, designed by Bonetti/Kozerski Architecture, spanning eight stories across  —  of which are outdoor exhibition space. In addition to exhibitions, the building features Pace Live, a multidisciplinary program of music, dance, film and conversation with a full-time curatorial director at the helm.

In 2020, Pace opened a temporary  exhibition space in East Hampton Village.

In 2021, Pace relocated its London outpost to 4 Hanover Square in Mayfair, the former home of the now-defunct Blain Southern gallery, and enlisted Jamie Fobert for the renovation of the  space.

In June 2022, Pace Gallery partnered with the NFT platform Art Blocks, with the intention of each organization giving access to each other's collectors bases.

In December 2022, Samanthe Rubell was named President of Pace Gallery, and a “Round Table, consisting of the gallery’s 10 most senior directors, was formed as a means to formalize the gallery’s structure.

Pace Wildenstein 
From 1993 to 2010, Pace operated jointly with Wildenstein & Co., a gallery specializing in old master painting, as PaceWildenstein. In 1993, after sales had slowed following the art-market crash of 1990, Arne Glimcher agreed to take up Daniel Wildenstein's long-standing merger offer; by 2010, the Glimcher family paid $100 million to buy back the Wildensteins' 49 percent share in Pace's assets, including an inventory of several thousand paintings.

Pace/MacGill 
Pace is a partner in the Pace/MacGill, which specializes in photographs and is run by Peter MacGill. From 1983 until 2019, Pace/MacGill maintained its standalone space at 32 East 57th Street before consolidating with Pace’s headquarters at 540 West 25th Street.

Publishing
Over the course of its first 50 years, Pace was involved in releasing some 450 catalogues for its shows and artists. In January 2009, PaceWildenstein announced plans for an independent publishing company called Artifex press, dedicated to the creation of online artists' catalogues raisonnés. In 2015, the company launched a unit specifically for digital catalogues raisonnés.

Other activities
In 2022, Pace partnered with Osulloc to create a café in Seoul, with artwork by Kohei Nawa.

Controversy
In 2016, London art dealer James Mayor filed a lawsuit against Arne Glimcher and the Agnes Martin catalogue raisonné committee, arguing that they had hurt the value of 13 works of Martin he sold after they decided not to include them in their catalogue. The New York Supreme Court dismissed the lawsuit in 2018.

In 2017, the CBRE Group alleged that Pace had failed to pay them over $3 million in commissions for advising the gallery during negotiations to redevelop the gallery’s flagship space at 540 West 25th Street with the building’s owner, Weinberg Properties (WP). By 2022, a United States District Court for the Southern District of New York jury brokerage awarded CBRE $6.3 million in damages.

In 2020, an investigation by Artnet News revealed allegations that two presidents at Pace, Douglas Baxter and Susan Dunne, had physically and verbally abused employees for nearly two decades. Former employees said that Baxter had thrown a phone at one employee's head and an audio recording revealed him telling the Parrish Art Museum's director that a woman who accused Chuck Close of sexual misconduct "should go live in Puerto Rico and be a hurricane victim, or starve in Haiti or Ethiopia, or be a bomb victim in Aleppo." The gallery launched an investigation into the presidents' conduct and ultimately parted ways with both employees. Dunne moved to work at David Zwirner; however, Pace retained Baxter as an advisor. The company then restructured its leadership.

In 2022, Pace Gallery filed a lawsuit in the New York Supreme Court over a fake Georges Seurat drawing purchased for $2 million from a man purporting to be Seurat’s descendant.

References

External links

Art museums and galleries in Manhattan
Art galleries established in 1960
Contemporary art galleries in the United States
1960 establishments in Massachusetts
Arts organizations based in the San Francisco Bay Area
Art museums and galleries in Ohio
Culture of Columbus, Ohio